The Apostolic Prefecture of Rhodes and adjacent islands was a Latin Catholic apostolic prefecture (missionary pre-diocesan jurisdiction, not entitled to a titular bishop) in the Greek Aegean islands.

History 
It was established on 14 August 1897 on territory once belonging to the then long-suppressed (but titular see-turned) historical Metropolitan Roman Catholic Archdiocese of Rhodes.

It was suppressed on 28 March 1928 to (re)establish on its territory the resurrected, but no longer Metropolitan Roman Catholic Archdiocese of Rhodes, which is also exempt, i.e. directly subject to the Holy See.

Ordinaries 
(all Latin missionary members of the Friars Minor (O.F.M.)

Apostolic Prefects of Rhodes and adjacent islands
 Andrea Felice da Ienne, O.F.M. (1897.08.31 – 1910)
 Ignace Beaufays, O.F.M. (1911.03.27 – ?)
 Bonaventura Rossetti, O.F.M. (? – ?); also? Apostolic Vicar of Libya (1907.08 – ?)
 Florido Ambrogio Acciari, O.F.M. (? – 1928.03.28), later apostolic administrator (1928.03.28 – 1929) and Archbishop (1938.03.30 – 1970.03.10) of successor archdiocese Rhodes

See also 
 Roman Catholicism in Greece

Sources and external links
 GigaCatholic

Apostolic prefectures
Former Roman Catholic dioceses in Greece
Dodecanese
1897 establishments in the Ottoman Empire
1928 disestablishments in Greece